Arenas de Armilla Cultura y Deporte is a Spanish football team based in Armilla, Granada, in the autonomous community of Andalusia. Founded in 1931 it plays in Tercera Federación, holding home matches at Estadio Municipal de Armilla, with a 2,000-seat capacity.

Season to season

1 season in Segunda División B
16 seasons in Tercera División
1 season in Tercera Federación

Notable former players
 Manuel Lucena

External links
Official website 
Futbolme.com profile 
lapreferente.com profile 

Football clubs in Andalusia
Association football clubs established in 1931
Divisiones Regionales de Fútbol clubs
1931 establishments in Spain